Strange Cousins from the West is the ninth full-length studio album by the American rock band Clutch, released in the UK on July 13, 2009 and in the US on July 14.

Album Information 
"Strange Cousins" was produced by J. Robbins--who previously worked with the band on Robot Hive/Exodus.

The album debuted at No. 38 on the Billboard 200 the week following its release with sales of 13,000 copies-- making it the band's highest debuting album. Following its release, Hammond organ player Mick Schauer, who had played with the band for the last two albums and their following tours, left the band. On May 13, 2009 the first single, "50,000 Unstoppable Watts" was released online. A video for this song was made available online on July 24, 2009. "Abraham Lincoln" can be listened to on the band's Ultimate Guitar profile.

In discussing the album's first single singer Neil Fallon said: "The song is more or less about where we rehearsed in Frederick, MD, next to an army base ( Fort Detrick) where they do a lot of the chemical weapons manufacturing and testing. So, when I’m saying 'Anthrax' I’m talking about Anthrax the chemical weapon not the band. And there is a lot of ham radio operators-- well, old ham towers there. And one morning I was going, well one morning, oh Jesus, one afternoon I was going to the liquor store and the lyrics just popped into my head after practice."

Reception

Initial critical response to Strange Cousins from the West was generally positive. At Metacritic (which assigns a normalized rating out of 100 to reviews from mainstream critics) the album received an average score of 72-- based on five reviews.

Track listing
All songs written by Clutch, except "Algo Ha Cambiado" written by Norberto Aníbal Napolitano and originally recorded by his Argentine band Pappo's Blues. 

The track "Metroliner Special" is available as a bonus track on some releases of the CD, via special online merchandise orders and is also available for free at their official website to download.

Personnel
Neil Fallon –  vocals, guitar
Tim Sult – guitar
Dan Maines – bass
Jean-Paul Gaster – drums, percussion

Production
 Produced by Clutch and J. Robbins
 Engineered and mixed by J Robbins at the Magpie Gage, Baltimore, MD
 Mastered by Bob Weston at Chicago Mastering Service
 Design and artwork by Nick Lakiotes
 Photographs by Rick Malkin
 Assembly - Rich Warwick for Built By Icon 
 Illustrations - Greg Franklin
 Management - Jack Flanagan for Issachar Entertainment / NYC

Charts

References

External links
 Clutch official website
 Interview with Clutch drummer JP Gaster about Strange Cousins from the West
 

2009 albums
Clutch (band) albums
Albums produced by J. Robbins